Maury Allen (born Maurice Allen Rosenberg; May 2, 1932 – October 3, 2010) was a Russian-American sportswriter, actor, and columnist for the New York Post and the Journal-News. He was also a voter for the Baseball Hall of Fame. Allen wrote 38 books on American sports icons. He also contributed to Thecolumnists.com.

Early life
Allen was born in Brooklyn, New York, to parents Harry and Frances Rosenberg. Harry Rosenberg was a coffee salesman and Frances a homemaker. His grandparents came from Russia He attended James Madison High School where he covered sports for the school paper.

As a young man, Allen was a Brooklyn Dodgers fanatic. His book, Brooklyn Remembered: The 1955 Days of the Dodgers, recalls the glory days of the team, before they were moved to Los Angeles.

After high school, he attended City College of New York where he majored in journalism and played for the football team. Allen had one older brother. Following college, Allen was drafted into the Army. He served in Japan and in Korea during the Korean War.

Sports journalism career

Allen wrote for the City College newspaper, The Campus, covering sports. When he was drafted to the Army, he continued as a reporter, writing for the Pacific Stars and Stripes. After his service, he wrote for papers in Indiana, Pennsylvania and New York.

In 1959, Allen was hired as sports writer at Sports Illustrated. He wrote for Sports Illustrated for two years. His next newspaper job was reporting for the New York Post from 1961 to 1988. From 1988 to 2000, he wrote articles for The Journal News, owned by the Gannett Company. Following his retirement from The Journal News, Allen continued to write books and to write articles for Thecolumnists.com.

Radio broadcasts
From 2002 to 2008, Allen co-hosted a weekly radio show called Talking Sports with Maury and Bill with the owner of Mickey Mantle's Restaurant, Bill Liederman. The show was broadcast live from Mickey Mantle's Restaurant, near Central Park in New York City. The one-hour long show featured sports talk and interviews with athletes. Allen was a contributor to a talk show hosted by Dave Cooperman and Bill Liederman called The Sports Buzz which was broadcast originally by WFAS-FM (2003-2004) in Westchester and then WCTC (2005-2007) in Central Jersey. Lori Rubinson from season 1 of ESPN's Dream Job and now a contributor on WFAN replaced Liederman. Cooperman and Rubinson moved the show to the WCTC studios and the show eventually was moved to the 5:00-7:00 time slot. Maury Allen remained a contributor through the life of the show.

Film appearances
Allen was interviewed on numerous occasions in documentary films, such as Toots (2006), Mantle (2006), and Howard Cosell: Telling It Like It Is (1999).

National Baseball Hall of Fame voter
Allen was a member of the Baseball Writers' Association of America, and was a voter for the National Baseball Hall of Fame for 35 years. He became eligible to vote in 1973 after more than 10 years as a traveling sports reporter.

Later work
Allen completed work on a book entitled "Dixie Walker of the Dodgers", a right fielder for the Yankees, White Sox, and Brooklyn Dodgers, and controversial figure in baseball in the 1940s for his stance against racial integration in Major League Baseball, which was released in 2010.

Publications
 Sports Illustrated, 1959-1961
 New York Post, 1961-1988
 Journal-News, 1988-2000
 The Columnists.com, 2001–?

Personal life
In 1962, Maury Allen married Janet Allen. They had two children, daughter Jennifer, and son Ted and four grandchildren. Prior to retirement, Allen was an avid tennis player. Friends and acquaintances often joked that Allen could be counted on to show up for tennis any day of the year. Allen died of lymphoma at the age of 78.

Awards and honors
Allen was granted a Lifetime Achievement Award by the Society of Silurians, one of the oldest journalistic organizations in existence. He was inducted into the B'nai B'rith Sports Hall of Fame, City College of New York Hall of Fame, the International Jewish Sports Hall of Fame, the James Madison High Hall of Fame, the Westchester County New York Hall of Fame, and the Brooklyn Dodgers Hall of Fame. On November 9, 2011, he was posthumously awarded the Townsend Harris Medal by the Alumni Association of City College of New York.

Bibliography
 Dixie Walker of the Dodgers, with Susan Walker and published by the University of Alabama Press
 Yankees World Series Memories
 Our Mickey: Cherished Memories of an American Icon
 Brooklyn Remembered: The 1955 Days of the Dodgers, co-author Bob Costas
 Mr. October: The Reggie Jackson Story
 Damn Yankee: The Billy Martin Story
 You Could Look It Up
 Big-Time Baseball
 Where Have You Gone, Joe DiMaggio?
 Bo: Pitching and Wooing
 Memories of the Mick: Baseball's Legend
 Voices of Sport
 Now Wait a Minute, Casey
 The Record Breakers
 The Incredible Mets
 After the Miracle
 Joe Namath's Sportin' Life
 Reprieve From Hell
 The Three Million Dollar Man
 Louisiana Lightning
 Jim Rice: Power Hitter
 China Spy
 A Sword in the Temple
 Slick
 Sweet Lou
 Ten Great Moments in Sports
 All Roads Lead to October
 Baseball's 100
 Jackie Robinson: A Life Remembered
 Baseball: The Lives Behind the Seams
 Greatest Pro Quarterbacks
 Yankees: Where Have You Gone?
 Baseball's 100
 Ron Guidry: Louisiana Lightning
 " Roger Maris: A Man For All Seasons"

ESPN credits
 The Top 5 Reasons You Can't Blame Ralph Branca for Losing the 1951 Pennant
 Yogi Berra
 George Steinbrenner
 Roger Maris
 Reggie Jackson
 Joe DiMaggio

See also
 List of Jewish American authors

Notes
 Complete Bibliography of Maury Allen Books
 Macmillan Publishing: Maury Allen
 Doris S. Michaels Literary Agency, Inc.

References

External links
 
 Thecolumnists.com
 Berger, Joseph. "Maury Allen, Sportswriter and Prolific Author, Dies at 78," The New York Times, Monday, October 4, 2010.

1932 births
2010 deaths
Jewish American journalists
Deaths from lymphoma
Sportswriters from New York (state)
Writers from Brooklyn
United States Army soldiers
James Madison High School (Brooklyn) alumni
United States Army personnel of the Korean War
Deaths from cancer in New Jersey
21st-century American Jews